Arcobacter cibarius is a species of Gram-negative, rod-shaped, slightly curved, non-spore-forming bacteria. LMG 21996T (=CCUG 48482T) is its type strain.

References

Further reading

Liu, Dongyou, ed. Molecular detection of foodborne pathogens. CRC Press, 2009.

External links
LPSN

Type strain of Arcobacter cibarius at BacDive -  the Bacterial Diversity Metadatabase

Campylobacterota
Bacteria described in 2005